Seka is a district (amphoe) in the eastern part of Bueng Kan province, northeastern Thailand.

Geography
Neighboring districts are (from the west clockwise) Phon Charoen, Si Wilai, Mueang Bueng Kan, Bung Khla, and Bueng Khong Long of Bueng Kan Province, Na Thom of Nakhon Phanom province, Akat Amnuai, Kham Ta Kla, and Ban Muang of Sakon Nakhon province.

The main river of the district is the Songkhram River. The Phu Wua Wildlife Sanctuary is in the district.

History
The minor district Seka was established on 16 November 1958, when the five sub-districts, Seka, Dong Bang, Sang, Pho Mak Khaeng, and Tha Kok Daeng were split off from Bueng Kan district. The following year it was upgraded to a full district.

Administration

Central administration 
Seka is divided into nine sub-districts (tambons), which are further subdivided into 136 administrative villages (mubans).

Missing numbers refer to subdistricts split off to form Bueng Khong Long district.

Local administration 
There are three sub-district municipalities (Thesaban Tambons) in the district:
 Tha Sa-at consisting of parts of sub-district Tha Sa-at.
 Si Phana consisting of parts of sub-district Seka.
 Sang consisting of sub-district Sang.

There are eight sub-district administrative organizations (SAO) in the district:
 Seka consisting of parts of sub-district Seka.
 Tha Kok Daeng consisting of sub-district Tha Kok Daeng.
 Ban Tong consisting of sub-district Ban Tong.
 Pong Hai consisting of sub-district Pong Hai.
 Nam Chan consisting of sub-district Nam Chan.
 Tha Sa-at consisting of parts of sub-district Tha Sa-at.
 Nong Thum consisting of sub-district Nong Thum.
 Sok Kam consisting of sub-district Sok Kam.

References

External links
amphoe.com (Thai)

 
Districts of Bueng Kan province